William Jonathan Kusila is a Tanzanian CCM politician and Member of Parliament for Bahi constituency in the National Assembly of Tanzania since 1995.

References

Chama Cha Mapinduzi MPs
Tanzanian MPs 2010–2015
Year of birth missing (living people)
Living people
Place of birth missing (living people)